"Beautiful Drug" is a song recorded by American country music group Zac Brown Band. It was released as the fourth single from the band's fourth studio album, Jekyll + Hyde, on September 21, 2015.  The song was written by Zac Brown and Niko Moon.

Critical reception
In his review of the album, Carl Wilson of Billboard gave the song a mixed review, saying that "The "beware who enter" sign is hung by the opener, "Beautiful Drug," which doesn't just flirt with top 40 EDM but checks it into a cheap motel for a quickie. The affair is brisk and forgettable, and soon gives way to more comfy MOR and gospel-rock cuts, but notice has been served." A review from Taste of Country was favorable, saying that "it's the most left-of-center single Zac Brown Band have ever released, which translates to their biggest risk. One gets a sense that this band is pretty comfortable at the edges of the format. It's the secret all but the most casual fan was aware of already anyway" and "Not all will [love it], as ZBB employ more effects than ever. But the song's relentless energy will convert most quickly."

Commercial performance
The song first entered the Hot Country Songs chart on the album release at No. 45 for chart dated May 16, 2015, selling 5,400 copies. It debuted on the Country Airplay chart at No. 54 for chart dated September 26, 2015, Billboard Hot 100 at No. 95 for chart dated November 21, 2015, and re-entered the Hot Country Songs chart at No. 48 on October 10, 2015. The band performed the song at the 2015 CMA Awards on November 4, 2015, which prompted 21,000 downloads for the week, and the song then debuted on the Billboard Hot 100 at No. 95. The song has sold 412,000 copies in the US as of May 2016.

Personnel
From Jekyll + Hyde liner notes.

 Coy Bowles – electric guitar
 Zac Brown – lead vocals, acoustic guitar, banjo, programming
 Clay Cook – background vocals, electric guitar
 Jimmy DeMartini – background vocals, violin
 Chris Fryar – drums
 John Driskell Hopkins – background vocals, baritone guitar
 Matt Mangano – bass guitar, acoustic guitar
 Niko Moon – background vocals
 Daniel de los Reyes – percussion
 Ben Simonetti – programming

Charts

Weekly charts

Year end charts

Certifications

References

2015 singles
2015 songs
Big Machine Records singles
Republic Records singles
Songs written by Zac Brown
Songs written by Niko Moon
Zac Brown Band songs